A Blind Legend is an action-adventure Audio game. The game was Supported financially by Centre national du cinéma et de l'image animée and other organizations. It was published by French studio Plug In Digital, and developed by Dowino for Microsoft Windows, IOS, macOS and Android. The game is without video/graphics, and requires headphones  to play this game.

Overview
The game is about a knight called Edward Blake whose wife has been captured by the guards of the king while looking for him.
The game has no video graphics and so the player requires stereo loudspeakers or a pair of headphones in order to play the game. The game uses binaural recording technology in order to render the sounds on the play field in 3D to make it possible for the player to faithfully find his or her direction. The controls of the game are primarily by the use of different touch screen combinations to play. In Windows, the mouse can be used in place of the touch screen.

Scenes
The game is divided into scenes, and a player must pass 1 scene in order to proceed to the next. If a player fails to pass the scene, for example when his character has been killed off, the player's total number of lives reduces and he/she has to repeat the scene until when the scene will be passed.

lives
The game is free to download on all the platforms. Upon download, a player is given Five lives which reduce whenever the player is killed by the enemies, is boiled over in the lake, enters into a bridge or is consumed by any trap. However, once the lives have been depleted, the player cannot play again until when the lives have been replenished or when the player decides to buy other lives from within the game's main screen. The lives pack are set to replenish after every 20 minutes after depletion.

Weapons and Controls
During playing, the following controls and weapons are available and which can be utilized by the player.

Sword
Used to fight with enemies whenever they confront the Knight the knight withdraws his sword automatically whenever he is challenged, but tapping the screen twice with two fingers also withdraws or keeps the sword away.
Shield.
Whenever the player is confronted he/she can pinch in the screen to activate the shield. If the player pinches out, the shield stops being active.
Combo attack.
This is performed by pinching in on the screen, then pinching out and flicking many times towards the direction of the enemy.

Plot
A Blind Legend is set in a medieval fantasy setting. The player assumes the role of a blind knight named Edward Blake whose wife has been captured in the square market by unknown captors. Accompanied by his daughter Louise, who guides him along the way, the protagonist has to traverse the kingdom of High Castle, facing various enemies and traps in order to reach the captors, make war with them and free his wife.

References

External links
Official website

2015 video games
Action video games
Android (operating system) games
Audio games
IOS games
MacOS games
Plug In Digital games
Single-player video games
Video games developed in France
Windows games